Männiku is a village in Saku Parish, Harju County in northern Estonia.

It has a railway station on the Tallinn - Viljandi railway line operated by Elron (rail transit).

See also
 Männiku, Tallinn
 Männiku training area

References

 

Villages in Harju County